Rahmon Adegoke Adedoyin, M.D. (born January 1, 1957) is a Nigerian educationist and businessman. He is the founder and proprietor of Oduduwa University and The Polytechnic, Ile-Ife. In an interview with Vanguard, Rahmon claimed that the late Oba Okunade Sijuwade had nominated him as the Ooni of Ife before his death because of "his developmental strides, particularly in the cradle of Yoruba land".

Early life, education and career
Rahmon Adegoke was born into the royal family of the Akui ruling house in the ancient city of Ife in Osun State, where he went on to complete his primary and secondary school education. He proceeded to the University of Ife (now Obafemi Awolowo University) where he obtained a Bachelor of Science degree in 1983 after studying Mathematics Education. He also attended Centurion International University, California where he obtained his master's degree and went on to bag a doctorate degree in 1996 from All Saints University School of Medicine, New York City.

In a bid to revamp education in Nigeria, Rahmon founded The Polytechnic, Ile-Ife in 1984 and Oduduwa University in 2009. He is a fellow of the Nigerian Institute of Industrial Statisticians.

Alleged Ritual killing 
Adedoyin was arrested in November 2021 following the death of Adegoke Timothy at his Hilton Hotel which he is the founder. He was denied bail but granted access to medical facilities of his choice pending court hearing.

References

Living people
1957 births
People from Ife
Nigerian businesspeople
Nigerian educational theorists
Obafemi Awolowo University alumni
All Saints University School of Medicine alumni
Yoruba academics
Founders of Nigerian schools and colleges
Yoruba royalty